Bitter and Sweet may refer to:

 Bitter & Sweet (album), a 2009 album by Beni
Bitter & Sweet, album by Akina Nakamori
"Bitter & Sweet", single by Roger Whittaker
 "Bitter & Sweet" (song), a song by